BitArmor Systems Inc. was a firm based in the Gateway Center of downtown Pittsburgh, Pennsylvania. Founded in 2003 by two Carnegie Mellon University alumni, BitArmor sold software-based encryption and data management technologies. The company mainly focused on industries that required protection of sensitive data, such as in retail, education, and health care.

BitArmor' primary product was BitArmor DataControl, a software solution that combined full disk encryption with persistent file encryption technology.

The company completed a $5 million round of venture capital funding in May 2009. BitArmor used the venture capital to fund development efforts and expand marketing and sales. At the time of the round of financing BitArmor employed 35 people.

BitArmor was acquired by Trustwave in January 2010, in order to strengthen the latter's PCI services.

Notes 

Computer security companies
Companies established in 2003